Shim-Sutcliffe Architects is a Canadian architectural design practice based in Toronto, Ontario.

Practice
Shim-Sutcliffe Architects was founded in 1994 by University of Toronto professor Brigitte Shim and her partner Howard Sutcliffe. The founders have been collaborating since the early 1980s. The studio's portfolio encompasses built work at all scales including the design and construction of buildings as well as furniture, lighting and landscapes. Shim-Sutcliffe works with public, private, and non-profit clients across Canada with projects in Hawaii and Russia.

Brigitte Shim 
Brigitte Shim (born 1958, Kingston, Jamaica) emigrated to Canada in 1965. She received a degree in environmental studies in 1981 and architecture in 1983 from the University of Waterloo, Ontario. Shim apprenticed with architect Arthur Erickson in Vancouver in 1981 and worked with Baird/Sampson Architects in Toronto from 1983-1987. Shim has been a professor at the John H. Daniels Faculty of Architecture, Landscape and Design at the University of Toronto since 1988, where she teaches architectural design studios and courses in the history and theory of landscape architecture. In 1997, her work in the Second Year architecture design studio was recognized by the American Institute of Architects Education Honors. Shim has also taught at the Yale School of Architecture as Eero Saarinen Visiting Professor in 2014, 2010 and 2005 and as an invited visiting professor at the École Polytechnique Fédérale de Lausanne, Harvard Graduate School of Design, the University of Auckland’s School of Architecture and Planning, as well as others. She has served on several international and national design juries including the 2007 Aga Khan Architecture Award Master Jury as well as architecture and design committees including the board of Build Toronto, the National Capital Commission's architectural advisory board, and the Waterfront Toronto Design Review Panel. She is also on the advisory council of BEAT (Building Equity in Architecture Toronto), which supports greater diversity and inclusion in the profession. In 2022, the Association of Chinese Canadian Entrepreneurs recognized Brigitte Shim with the ACCE Lifetime Achievement Award, which over the years has recognized many of the nation’s influential political, business, and community leaders.

Howard Sutcliffe 
Howard Sutcliffe (born 1958, Yorkshire, England) emigrated to Canada in 1964. He met Brigitte while studying at the University of Waterloo where he also earned degrees in environmental studies (1981) and architecture (1983). After graduating, he worked successively in the studios of Paul Merrick of Vancouver and for Ronald Thom, Barton Myers, and Kuwabara Payne McKenna Blumberg (KPMB) Architects of Toronto. He played a key role on several award-winning competition teams for both Barton Myers and KPMB including Kitchener City Hall (KPMB). He was the first recipient of the Ronald J. Thom Award given for early design achievement by the Canada Council for the Arts.

Recognition 
To date, Shim and Sutcliffe have received 16 Governor General's Medal and Awards for Architecture from the Royal Architectural Institute of Canada (RAIC) and an American Institute of Architects (AIA) National Honor Award. In 2021 they were awarded the RAIC Gold Medal, the country's highest architectural honour in recognition of a significant and lasting contribution to Canadian architecture. The jury attributed their relentless pursuit of excellence to the production of a significant body of exceptional design works and determined that "the poetic quality and independence of their design work, their thoughtful and holistic consideration of site, materiality, typologies, the senses, and their in inventiveness have made Shim and Sutcliffe exemplars of architectural practice in Canada." In 2013, the couple was presented with the Order of Canada for "designing sophisticated structures that represent the best of Canadian design to the world." They were also the recipients of the 2020 Heritage of the Future Award for "an outstanding body of work that prioritizes the integration of built form with natural environment, the innovative use of building materials, and exceptional design."

Publications
Shim-Sutcliffe has their work published in a wide variety of mediums since established. Selected publications include:
 Shim-Sutcliffe: The 2001 Charles & Ray Eames Lecture published by Michigan Architecture Papers, 2002 
 Site Unseen: Laneway Architecture & Urbanism in Toronto edited by Brigitte Shim & Donald Chong, 2004
 Integral House by Brigitte Shim and Edward Burtynsky, 2006
 Five North American Architects: An Anthology by Kenneth Frampton, 2012 
 Shim-Sutcliffe: The Passage of Time edited by Anette W. LeCuyer, 2014
 Canadian Architecture: Evolving a Cultural Identity by Leslie Jen, 2021
 Shim-Sutcliffe: The Architecture of Point William; A laboratory of living edited by Kenneth Frampton & Michael Webb, 2021

Notable Projects
 1988: Garden Pavilion and Reflecting Pool
 1989: House on Horse Lake
 1994: Laneway House
 1995: Craven Road House
 1999: Muskoka Boathouse
 2000: Moorelands Camp Dining Hall
 2001: Weathering Steel House
 2004: Ravine Guest House and Reflecting Pool
 2004: Corkin Gallery
 2006: Craven Road Studio
 2009: Integral House
 2013: Residence for the Sisters of St. Joseph Toronto
 2015: Wong Dai Sin Temple
 2022: Ace Hotel Toronto

Shim-Sutcliffe Architects also debuted specialty furniture and lighting items for their clients. Most well known is the HAB Collection that is currently manufactured and distributed by Nienkämper. Another popular item from the studio is the Firefly Lamp which is meant to resemble fireflies in a mason jar that glows even after the lamp is turned off.

References

External links 

Shim Sutcliffe website
Finding aid for the Shim-Sutcliffe fonds, Canadian Centre for Architecture

Architecture firms of Canada